Unnamed Battery No. 1 is an historic artillery battery located at Clark's Point, James Island, Charleston County, South Carolina. It was built in 1862, and was the southern end of the eastern James Island line. At the end of the war this battery mounted two field guns. The earthen redoubt measures approximately 240 feet long and 200 feet wide. It has a 12 foot high parapet wall and a powder magazine about 17 feet in height.

It was listed on the National Register of Historic Places in 1982.

References 

Military facilities on the National Register of Historic Places in South Carolina
Military installations established in 1862
Buildings and structures in Charleston County, South Carolina
National Register of Historic Places in Charleston County, South Carolina
1862 establishments in South Carolina
Military units and formations established in 1862
American Civil War on the National Register of Historic Places
Artillery batteries